Gautam Bhatia may refer to:
 Gautam Bhatia (architect) (born 1952), Indian architect
 Gautam Bhatia (lawyer) (born 1988), Indian scholar